Rustum Kozain (born 1966) is a South African poet and writer.

Life
Kozain was born in Paarl. After he matriculated, he studied at the University of Cape Town. During this time, he focus his PhD research on selected South Africa poetry in English from 1970 to 1990. In 1994 and 1995 he attended Bowling Green State University in Ohio, United States on a Fulbright Scholarship. From 1998 to 2004 he was a lecturer at the University of Cape Town.

In addition to two collections of poetry, he has also published reviews, essays and short fiction. Further writing can be found on his personal web site at Groundwork.

Kozain has won a number of awards for his poetry. These include: the Philip Stein Poetry Award in 1997, the Thomas Pringle Award in 2004, the Ingrid Jonker Prize for This Carting Life (2005) and the Olive Schreiner Prize in 2007 and 2014.

Works
 This Carting Life, Kwela Books, 2005
 Groundwork, Kwela Books, 2012

References

External links
Groundwork, Rustum Kozain's website

1966 births
Living people
21st-century South African poets
People from Paarl
South African male poets